Erker is a surname. Notable people with the surname include:

 August Erker (1879–1951), American rower
 Johann Erker (1773–1809), Austrian rebel leader

See also
 Bay window

Surnames of German origin